The following is a list of Bellarmine Knights men's basketball head coaches. The Knights have had 11 coaches in their 73-season history.

Bellarmine's current head coach is Scott Davenport. He was hired in April 2005 to replace Chris Pullem, who was fired after the 2004–05 season.

References

Bellarmine

Bellarmine Knights men's basketball coaches